The 1st Honinbo was the first ever professional Go tournament. Eight players competed for the title. The tournament utilized a makeshift league system where players would play four knockout rounds. At the end of each round, the winning player would receive six points. The runner-up would receive five, and the losing semi-finalists would have a playoff to decide who finished in third (four points) and fourth (three points). Players knocked out in the first round received one point.

White received 4.5 komi during the knockout rounds and players had 13 hours thinking time. Tamejiro Suzuki, however, was granted 16 hours thinking time because of his disdain for time limits. At the conclusion of the fourth knockout round, the two top players in the standings, Riichi Sekiyama and Shin Kato, played a six-game series to decide the winner. The initial series finished even at three games, but Sekiyama was given the title for having accumulated more points in the knockout rounds.

Tournament

First knockout round

Second knockout round

Third knockout round

Fourth knockout round

Final standings

References 

Go competitions in Japan
1941 in go